Tala Setu is a bridge on the Kolkata Circular railway in the state of West Bengal. It connects the Shyambazar area of Kolkata with the Kolkata's northern suburbs.

The bridge was opened in 1962, but due to structural weakness of the bridge, demolition work was started by Indian Railways from February 2020. The demolition work was completed by April 2020. The new bridge was opened on 22 September 2022. The total length of the new bridge is 743.43 meters. A total of 468 crore was spent to build the bridge. The bridge was built on a government initiative under the Department of Public Works.

References

Bridges in Kolkata